State Route 829 (SR 829) is a state highway in Lyon County, Nevada. Also known as Wellington Road, the route serves as a shortcut connecting State Route 338 to State Route 208 near Wellington.

History

Wellington Road was established as an unimproved roadway as early as 1917 and, by 1929, had been made part of State Route 22, a longer route through the Smith Valley connecting Wellington to Bridgeport, California. The Wellington Road portion of SR 22 was reassigned to State Route 829 in Nevada's state highway renumbering in the late 1970s, with the remainder of the old route becoming State Route 338.

Major intersections

References

829